Big Brother 4 is the fourth season of the Belgian version of Big Brother aired in the Flemish Region of Belgium on KanaalTwee.

It was preceded by Big Brother All Stars which made it the shortest regular season in Belgium. The show started on 21 September 2003 and finished on 14 December 2003 with a total duration of 85 days. Kristof Van Camp won €50,000. 12 housemates entered the house during the launch.

This season wasn't as successful as the producers hoped. The whole season was built around a massive exit halfway through the season. Because of bullying and a lot of conflicts, 5 housemates left the house voluntarily. Leaving only 1 housemate being evicted at the massive exit. The season also been criticized for animal abuse. The producers solved this in agreement with the Belgian organization for animal welfare, GAIA, by creating a task for the animal charity.

Ratings dropped in comparison with previous seasons. Daily highlights episodes got 300,000 viewers. The final was watched by 720,000 viewers. After the season, Big Brother was axed for an undetermined time in 2004.

Format
This season was built around a twist, which the producers called the big twist. The season started with the audience nominating their favorite housemates but the housemates would think this would be the least favorite housemates. The housemates would have to evict one of the nominated housemates. Thinking the evicted housemate would leave the Big Brother game, the evicted housemates would actually go to a secret location. After weeks, the housemates would be divided into two groups:
 The first group in the house with the least favorite housemates (believing they would be the most favorite housemates).
 The second group with the favorite (evicted) housemates at the secret location.
Halfway through the season, the twist would be revealed to housemates. Those housemates would have to leave the house immediately in a massive exit. Once they'd left, the favorite housemates could return to the Big Brother house to stay for the rest of the weeks.

Housemates

Weekly summary

Nominations table

Notes

External links
 World of Big Brother

References

04
2003 television seasons